Thomas Bilbe (1803 – 28 November 1884) was an English shipbuilder and shipowner based in Rotherhithe. He built tea clippers and was involved in the opium trade with China.

Thomas was born in Sheerness, Kent and married Eliza Ann Chappell 30 January 1826, St. John's, Horsleydown.

References

1811 births
1896 deaths
Drug dealers
British shipbuilders
Ship owners
People from Sheerness
19th-century English businesspeople
People from Rotherhithe